Jatun Quenamari (possibly from Quechua hatun big (jatun in Bolivia), Aymara or Quechua qinamari (a possible spelling)) is a mountain in the Vilcanota mountain range in the Andes of Peru, about  high. It is situated in the Puno Region, Carabaya Province, Corani District. Jatun Quenamari lies east of the large glaciated area of Quelccaya (Quechua for "snow plain"), southwest of Cuncunani.

References

Mountains of Puno Region
Mountains of Peru